Hlavné námestie (literally "Main Square") is one of the most well known squares in Bratislava, Slovakia. It is located in the Old Town and it is often considered to be the center of the city.

Some of the main landmarks found in the square are the Old Town Hall and Roland Fountain.

Name 

During the Second World War, this square was named in honor of Adolf Hitler. During the communist period (1948–1989), the square was named Námestie 4. apríla (literally  4 April Square, April 4 having been the day when Bratislava was liberated by the Red Army at the end of World War II).

Gallery

References 

Squares in Bratislava